The Kishenehn Formation is a Paleogene stratigraphic unit in Montana. Fossil amiiforme and teleost fish have been found in outcrops of the formation's Coal Creek Member in Glacier National Park. Mosquitos have also been found in the Coal Creek Member, and have been found to be hematophagous. It is considered a Middle Eocene Lagerstätte.

Footnotes

References
Hunt, ReBecca K., Vincent L. Santucci and Jason Kenworthy. 2006. "A preliminary inventory of fossil fish from National Park Service units." in S.G. Lucas, J.A. Spielmann, P.M. Hester, J.P. Kenworthy, and V.L. Santucci (ed.s), Fossils from Federal Lands. New Mexico Museum of Natural History and Science Bulletin 34, pp. 63–69.

Paleogene Montana